The Zhuganpo Formation is a Triassic geologic unit found in southern China. It has historically been known as the Zhuganpo Member of the Falang Formation. A diverse fossil assemblage known as the Xingyi biota or Xingyi Fauna can be found in the upper part of the Zhuganpo Formation. Fossils of the Xingyi biota include articulated skeletons of marine reptiles, abundant fish, and a plentiful assortment of invertebrates indicating a Ladinian to Carnian age for the sediments of the formation.

Paleobiota

Invertebrates 

 Ammonites: Clionitites sp., Detoniceras sp., Haoceras xingyiense, Parasturia sp., Protrachyceras sp., Ptychites sp., Sinomeginoceras (S. wangi, S. xingyiense), Trachyceras sp., Xenoprotrachyceras cf. primum, Yangites densicostatus,
 Bivalves: Daonella sp.
 Conodonts: Gladigondolella malayensis, Metapolygnathus / Paragondolella / Quadralella (Q. aff. acuminatus, P. foliata, P. inclinata, Q. intermedius, Q. langdaiensis, P. maantangensis, P. navicula, M. nodosus, M. parafoliata, Q. aff. praelindae, P. polygnathiformis, Q. shijiangjunensis, Q. tadpole, Q. uniformis, Q. wanlanensis, Q. aff. wayaoensis, Q. yongueensis, Q. aff. zonneveldi)
 Crinoids: Traumatocrinus hsui
 Crustaceans ("shrimps"): Schimperella acanthocercus (Lophogastrida)

Fish 

 Acrolepidae indet.
 Archaesemionotus sp.
 aff. Arctacanthus sp. (Chimaeriformes?)
 Asialepidotus shingyiensis (Ionoscopiformes)
 Birgeria liui
 Caturidae indet.
 Eosemionotus sp.
 Favusodus orientalis (Euselachii)
 Fuyuanichthys wangi (Ginglymodi)
 Fuyuanperleidus dengi
 Guizhouamia bellula
 Guizhoubrachysomus minor
 Guizhoucoelacanthus guanlingensis
 Guizhouniscus microlepidus
 Habroichthys sp.
 Keichouodus nimaiguensis (Euselachii)
 Luganoia fortuna (Luganoiidae)
 Malingichthys (M. nimaiguensis, M. wanfendlinensis; Pholidophoridae)
 Marcopoloichthys sp.
 Peltopleurus (P. orientalis, P. tyrannos)
 Peripeltopleurus sp. (Wushaichthyidae)
 Pholidophoridae indet.
 Potanichthys xingyiensis (Thoracopteridae)
 Rosaodus xingyiensis (Elasmobranchii)
 Saurichthys sp.
 Sinoeugnathus kueichowensis
 Wushaichthys exquisitus (Wushaichthyidae)
 Xingyia gracilis

Reptiles

References

Geologic formations of China
Triassic System of Asia
Triassic China
Carnian Stage
Ladinian Stage
Paleontology in Guizhou
Paleontology in Yunnan